Elachista sphaerella is a moth of the family Elachistidae. It is found in the Northern Territory.

The forewings are grey in males and black with a bronzy sheen and three white spots in females. The hindwings are dark grey in both sexes.

The larvae have been reared on a Carex species.

References

Moths described in 2011
sphaerella
Moths of Australia
Taxa named by Lauri Kaila